Sergeant Edward David "Ted" Smout OAM (5 January 1898 – 22 June 2004) was an Australian soldier in the First World War. He was Australia's 6th last surviving World War I veteran.

Smout served in the army as a stretcher bearer. He was notably one of the first on the scene upon the landing of Manfred von Richthofen, the Red Baron, after he had been shot down and was witness to his final words. He was also the last surviving witness of Richthofen's death.

Biography

Smout was born in Brisbane, Queensland in 1898.  He joined the Australian Army Medical Corps in September 1915 at the age of 17, giving his age as 18 years 8 months. Upon arrival in France, he was posted to the 3rd Sanitary Section of the Australian Army Medical Corps where he served as a stretcher bearer.

During an engagement near the Somme River on 21 April 1918, Smout was an eyewitness to the final moments in the life and career of the famous German flying ace Manfred von Richthofen (aka the "Red Baron"), whose aeroplane had landed nearby after he was fatally shot. Smout reported that Richthofen's last word was "kaputt" ("finished") just before he died. Smout said later in life that he resisted the temptation to souvenir the Red Baron's boots and Iron Cross.  He was discharged on 8 September 1919. In 1922, Ted joined an insurance firm, beginning a successful career that would last till his retirement in 1958.

He was awarded France's highest honour, being made a Chevalier (Knight) of the Legion d'Honneur in 1998 and also received the Medal of the Order of Australia for service to the community. A regular participant in Anzac Day marches, Smout became one of the most celebrated war veterans in Queensland as one of Australia's last surviving WWI veterans. He died at 106 years old, predeceased by his wife of 69 years, Ella Annie Grace Stevens (November 1, 1900 – March 7, 1992). He is survived by his three children, 12 grandchildren and 23 great-grandchildren.

His son, Dr. Westall David "Westy" Smout (born June 11, 1924), himself a Second World War "Bomber Navigator" veteran. On July 14, 1950, Westy married Dr. Ruth A. Yolanda Cilento (July 30, 1925 – April 18, 2016), the second daughter of doctors Sir Raphael Cilento and Phyllis McGlew.

According to historical journalist Jonathan King, "Ted Smout's legacy is in the hundreds of newspaper articles written about him, the book he wrote Three Centuries Spanned, hours and hours of video footage instructing Australians not to get involved in conflicts like Iraq or Afghanistan. His main message always was we should not glorify war. It was a mistake to fight in a far flung battle that had nothing to do with Australia, and he pleaded with the nation never to do it again."

He appeared in the series People's Century discussing his recollections of the First World War in the episode "Killing Fields". Because of his eyewitness account of Richthofen's death, he also often appeared in the media. Some of his last known footage was talking in 2002 (aged about 104) for the Discovery Channel detective-documentary film about the Red Baron's death.

He was a supporter of Australian becoming a republic and was a member of the Australian Republic Movement.

Death 
He died in 2004, aged 106. At the time, he was the oldest surviving veteran of the war.

Honours and awards
 Medal of the Order of Australia (awarded 6 June 1978)
 British War Medal
 Victory Medal
 80th Anniversary Armistice Remembrance Medal (awarded 21 April 1999)
 Centenary Medal (awarded 1 January 2002)
 Chevalier (Knight) of the Légion d'honneur (awarded 4 July 1998)
 Ted Smout Memorial Bridge named in his honour (14 July 2009)

References

External links
 National Archives of Australia Service Record for Sgt E.D. Smout, Regt Number 12947

1898 births
2004 deaths
Australian centenarians
Men centenarians
Australian republicans
Recipients of the Medal of the Order of Australia
Chevaliers of the Légion d'honneur
Recipients of the Centenary Medal
Queensland Greats